The 1964 All-Ireland Minor Football Championship was the 33rd staging of the All-Ireland Minor Football Championship, the Gaelic Athletic Association's premier inter-county Gaelic football tournament for boys under the age of 18.

Kerry entered the championship as defending champions, however, they were defeated in the Munster Championship.

On 27 September 1964, Offaly won the championship following a 0-15 to 1-11 defeat of Cork in the All-Ireland final. This was their first All-Ireland title. It remains their only title in the minor grade.

Results

Connacht Minor Football Championship

Semi-Finals

Mayo beat Roscommon at Carrick-on-Shannon.

Galway 3-10 Sligo 0-4 at Tuam.

Final

Mayo 2-7 Galway 1-3 Tuam.

Leinster Minor Football Championship

Munster Minor Football Championship

Ulster Minor Football Championship

All-Ireland Minor Football Championship

Semi-Finals

August 9th Offaly 1-10 Mayo 1-8 Croke Park. 

Final

References

1964
All-Ireland Minor Football Championship